The Hollywoodbets Dolphins are a cricket team representing the KwaZulu-Natal (Coastal) province in South Africa. They take part in the CSA 4-Day Series first-class competition, the Momentum One-Day Cup and the Mzansi Super League T20 competition. The team's home venues are Kingsmead Cricket Ground, Durban and the Pietermaritzburg Oval in Pietermaritzburg.

History 
The Dolphins were originally created as an entirely professional franchise team after the South African domestic format was restructured in 2004-05. Up until then eleven provincial teams, with various small changes, had competed in the Currie Cup since 1893-94. 

Natal (as the province was then called) was one of the most successful teams in the 20th century provincial era with twenty title wins. In 1998-99, Natal became KwaZulu-Natal to reflect the political changes that were taking place in the country. The team won one more final title in 2001-02.

In 2004-05, the eleven provincial teams were rationalised into six new, entirely professional franchises, in all three formats. The Dolphins were the only squad that did not merge several other provincial teams to form the new side. In the Franchise-era, the Dolphins won only one outright title, with two others being shared wins.

In 2020, domestic cricket in South Africa was restructured and the six former franchise teams were dropped. In its place was a return to the more traditional two-division league format, with a total of fifteen professional teams competing due to the previously semi-professional provincial cricket being subsumed (effectively becoming Division 2). 

The former name of KwaZulu-Natal (Coastal) could have returned during this time (KwaZulu-Natal (Inland) was granted first class provincial status in 2009), however the KwaZulu-Natal Cricket Union decided to maintain the brand recognition from the franchise era, with the new team continuing to be called the Dolphins.

Playing kit
The Hollywoodbets Dolphins home kit consists of black shirts and black trousers with green trim during limited overs competitions. The away strip for limited overs competitions is purple shirts and purple trousers with yellow trim.

Sponsors
Hollywoodbets are the Dolphins' primary shirt sponsors until the end of the 2019/20 season, with local radio station East Coast Radio (ECR 94.5FM) their associate sponsor.

Honours
 CSA 4-Day Series (1) – 2020-21 ; shared (2) – 2004–05, 2005–06
 Momentum One Day Cup Winners (1) - 2019-20 ; shared (1) 2017/18 (shared with Warriors)
Ram Slam T20 Challenge Winners 2013/14

The Hollywoodbets Dolphins finished as runners-up in the 2017/18 Ram Slam T20 Challenge, after losing to the Multiply Titans in the final at Centurion.

The Hollywoodbets Dolphins reached the final of the 2017/18 Momentum One Day Cup after beating the Cape Cobras in the semi-final. The Dolphins played the Warriors in the final at Kingsmead, however the match was abandoned halfway through the Dolphins first innings due to persistent rain. The rain continued on the reserve day forcing the final to be abandoned, and the trophy was shared between the two teams.

Squad

 Bold denotes players with international caps.

Former players 
Former Dolphins cricketers include Proteas players Shaun Pollock, Jonty Rhodes, Pat Symcox, Lance Klusener, Andrew Hudson, Errol Stewart, Dale Benkenstein, Imraan Khan, Morné van Wyk, Dane Vilas and Mthokozisi Shezi. Hashim Amla played for the Dolphins for many seasons before moving to the Cape Cobras. Kyle Abbott played for the Dolphins before moving to Hampshire on a Kolpak deal.

International players to play for the Dolphins include Malcolm Marshall, Collis King, Hartley Alleyne, Nixon McLean, Eldine Baptiste, Neil Johnson, Sanath Jayasuriya, Ravi Bopara, Graham Onions and Kevin Pietersen.

Current Proteas cricketers in the Hollywoodbets Dolphins squad include Keshav Maharaj, David Miller, Imran Tahir, Andile Phehlukwayo, Robert Frylinck, Vaughn van Jaarsveld, Khaya Zondo, Senuran Muthusamy and Daryn Dupavillon.

References
 South African Cricket Annual – various editions
 Wisden Cricketers' Almanack – various editions

South African first-class cricket teams
Sport in Durban
2003 establishments in South Africa
Cricket clubs established in 2003
Cricket in KwaZulu-Natal